This is a list of all the yachts built by Alloy Yachts, sorted by year.

Sailing yachts

Motor yachts

See also 
 List of large sailing yachts
 List of motor yachts by length
 Luxury yacht
 Sailing yacht

References 

Alloy Yachts
Built by Alloy
Built by Alloy
Alloy Yachts